Oswestry is a market town, civil parish and historic railway town in Shropshire, England, close to the Welsh border. It is at the junction of the A5, A483 and A495 roads.

The town was the administrative headquarters of the Borough of Oswestry until that was abolished in 2009. Oswestry is the third-largest town in Shropshire, following Telford and Shrewsbury. At the 2011 Census, the population was 17,105. The town is five miles (8 km) from the Welsh border and has a mixed English and Welsh heritage.

Oswestry is the largest settlement within the Oswestry Uplands, a designated natural area and national character area.

Toponym

The name Oswestry is first attested in 1191, as Oswaldestroe. This Middle English name transparently derives from the Old English personal name Ōswald and the word trēow ('tree'). Thus the name seems once to have meant 'tree of a man called Ōswald'. However, the traditional Welsh name for the town,  (first attested in 1254), means 'Oswald's cross', and 'cross' is a possible meaning of Old English trēow. Thus the town's name may have meant 'Oswald's cross' in both English and Welsh.

The Oswald mentioned is widely imagined to have been Oswald of Northumbria, who died at the Battle of Maserfield in 641/642. The location of the battle is debated among scholars, but for much of the twentieth century was assumed to be at Oswestry. However, A. D. Mills's Dictionary of English Place Names concluded that 'the traditional connection with St Oswald, 7th-century king of Northumbria, is uncertain'.

The name and the association with King Oswald have attracted more fanciful interpretations. According to legend, one of the dismembered Oswald's arms was carried to an ash tree by a raven. Miracles were subsequently attributed to the tree, and the legend has it that this was "Oswald's Tree", and gave its name to the town. A spring called 'Oswald's Well' is supposed to have originated where the bird dropped the arm from the tree, though one historian has suggested that it was likely to have had sacred associations long before Oswald's time. The water from the well was believed to have healing properties, particularly for curing eye trouble. Offa's Dyke runs near the well, to the west.

There is an alternative view that Oswestry was named after Oswy, Oswald's brother, who fought a battle here against King Penda in 655 AD. Oswy became King of Northumbria after Oswald's death in 642 AD. The battle of 655 AD was fought near to a river called the Winwead, which it is believed, was the nearby River Vyrnwy. Welsh folklore has it that this battle was called the battle of Pengwern and in it their leader Cynddylan was also killed.

History

Prehistory 
The earliest known human settlement in Oswestry is Old Oswestry, one of the best-preserved Iron Age hill forts in Britain, with evidence of construction and occupation between 800BC and 43AD. The site is known in Welsh as Caer Ogyrfan, meaning 'City of Gogyrfan', referring to the father of Guinevere in Arthurian legend.

Saxon times 
The Battle of Maserfield is widely thought to have been fought at Oswestry in 641 or 642, between the Anglo-Saxon kings Penda of Mercia and Oswald of Northumbria. However, the location of the battle is debated among scholars.

The Conquest 
The Domesday Book (1086) records the castle being built by Rainald, a Norman Sheriff of Shropshire: .

Alan fitz Flaad (died c.1120), a Breton knight, was granted the feudal barony of Oswestry by King Henry I who, soon after his accession, invited Alan to England with other Breton friends, and gave him forfeited lands in Norfolk and Shropshire, including some which had previously belonged to Ernulf de Hesdin (killed at Antioch while on crusade) and Robert of Bellême.

Alan's duties to the Crown included supervision of the Welsh border. He also founded Sporle Priory in Norfolk. He married Ada or Adeline, daughter of Ernulf de Hesdin. Their eldest son William FitzAlan was made High Sheriff of Shropshire by King Stephen in 1137. He married a niece of Robert of Gloucester. Alan's younger son, Walter, travelled to Scotland in the train of King David I, Walter becoming the first hereditary Steward of Scotland and ancestor of the Stewart Royal family.

Border town 
The town changed hands between the English and the Welsh a number of times during the Middle Ages and still retains some Welsh-language street and place names. In 1972, ITV broadcast a television report asking residents if they thought the town should be English or Welsh, with mixed responses.

In 1149 the castle was captured by Madog ap Maredudd during 'The Anarchy', and it remained in Welsh hands until 1157. Occasionally in the 13th century it is referred to in official records as Blancmuster (1233) or Blancmostre (1272), meaning "White Minster". Later, Oswestry was attacked by the forces of Welsh rebel leader Owain Glyndŵr during the early years of his rebellion against the English King Henry IV in 1400; it became known as Pentrepoeth or "hot village" as it was burned and nearly totally destroyed by the Welsh. The castle was reduced to a pile of rocks during the English Civil War.

The town is now the home of the Shropshire libraries' Welsh Collection.

Market town 

In 1190 the town was granted the right to hold a market each Wednesday. The town built walls for protection, but these were torn down in the English Civil War by the Parliamentarians  after they took the town from the Royalists after a brief siege on 22 June 1644, leaving only the Newgate Pillar visible today.

After the foot and mouth outbreak in the late 1960s the animal market was moved out of the town centre. In the 1990s, a statue of a shepherd and sheep was installed in the market square as a memorial to the history of the market site.

Military 
Park Hall, a mile east of the town, was taken over by the Army during World War I in 1915 and used as a training camp and military hospital. On 26 December 1918 it burnt to the ground following an electrical fault. The ruined hall and camp remained derelict between the wars, the camp hospital, however, was still in use; the Baschurch Convalescent and Surgical Home moved there in February 1921 and it became known as the Robert Jones and Agnes Hunt Orthopaedic Hospital.

One of the main uses of the land from the 1920s was for motorcycle racing and it became quite a well-known circuit.

The camp was reactivated in July 1939 for Royal Artillery training and the Plotting Officers' School. Following World War II, Oswestry was a prominent military centre for Canadian troops, then for the British Royal Artillery, and finally a training centre for 15 to 17-year-old Infantry Junior Leaders. The camp closed in 1975. During the 1970s some local licensed wildfowlers discharged their shotguns at some passing ducks and were shot themselves by a young military guard, who had mistaken them for an attacking IRA force.

The area previously occupied by the Park Hall military camp is now mainly residential and agricultural land, with a small number of light industrial units. Park Hall Farm became a visitor attraction in 1998, it is home to the Museum of the Welsh Guards. The Park Hall Football Stadium (home of The New Saints FC) and The Venue is now closed.

Landmarks 

Old Oswestry, situated on the northern edge of the town, dominates the northern and eastern approaches. The 3,000-year-old settlement is one of the most spectacular and best preserved Iron Age hill forts in Britain, with evidence of construction and occupation between 800 BC and AD 43.

Other attractions in and around Oswestry include:  Park, Shelf Bank, Wilfred Owen Green, Saint Oswald's Well at Maserfield, Oswestry Castle, and the Cambrian Railway Museum located near the former railway station. Oswestry Guildhall, the meeting place of Oswestry Town Council, was completed in 1893.

A story incorporating the names of all of the many pubs once open in Oswestry can be found hanging on a wall inside The Oak Inn on Church Street. There is a tapestry of 40 Oswestry pub signs on display in Oswestry Guildhall on the Bailey Head. The Stonehouse Brewery was opened in 2007, on the site of the former Weston Wharf railway station at Weston, in nearby Oswestry Rural; Stonehouse Brewery supplies many of the pubs with real ale.

Brogyntyn Hall, which belonged until recently to the Lords Harlech, lies just outside the town. Brogyntyn Park is five and a half acres of parkland occupying the southern slope of the Grade II listed Brogyntyn Estate. It was gifted to Oswestry Town Council by the fourth Lord Harlech, William Ormsby-Gore, on 11 August 1952.

Culture 
There is a range of arts related activities in the town.

 The Qube
 Oswestry Visitor & Exhibition Centre
 Willow Gallery
 The Oswestry Town Museum
 Cambrian Railways Museum
 Attfield Theatre
 Fusion Arts organises arts and music activities for young people.
 Kinokulture, a cinema
 Hermon Chapel Arts Centre
 Oswestry Choral Society, the Oswestry Recorded Music Society, and the Oswestry Ladies Choir has developed.
 OsRocks Choir
 Wilfred Owen Green
 Borderland Visual Arts. A network of local artists which holds an annual Open Studios event 
 Borderlines Film Festival
 The Oswestry Food and Drink Festival
 Oswestry Balloon Festival
 The Whittington International Chamber Music Festival

Religion 
In the 2011 Census, 68.7% of the population of Shropshire stated that their religion was 'Christian'. The second largest group (22.8%) stated that they had 'no religion'.

There are a number of places of worship in Oswestry.

Oswestry is divided into two Church of England parishes, which are part of the Diocese of Lichfield: Holy Trinity, which encompasses Oswestry East and eastern part of Oswestry Rural; and St. Oswald, which encompasses Oswestry South, Oswestry West and the western part of Oswestry Rural. Each parish has its own parish church.

St Oswald's Church was first mentioned in the 1085 Domesday book and a tithe document in Shrewsbury the same year. St Oswald's Church is Grade II* listed, having a tower dating from late 12th or early 13th century and later additions particularly in the 17th and 19th centuries. There is a new window in the east nave, designed by stained glass artist Jane Gray in 2004.

In June 2022, it was announced that, from January 2023, oversight of traditional Catholics within the Anglican Church in the west of Province of Canterbury (formerly the Bishop of Ebbsfleet's area) would be taken by a new Bishop of Oswestry, suffragan to the Bishop of Lichfield. The Bishop of Oswestry serves the western 13 dioceses of the southern province (Bath and Wells, Birmingham, Bristol, Coventry, Derby, Exeter, Gloucester, Hereford, Lichfield, Oxford, Salisbury, Truro, and Worcester).

The town of Oswestry and surrounding villages fall into the parish of Our Lady Help of Christians and St Oswald, in the Roman Catholic Diocese of Shrewsbury. The single Catholic church is Our Lady and St Oswald's Catholic Church. There is an associated primary school.

There are two Methodist churches: the Horeb Church on Victoria Road and the Oswestry Methodist Church. Cornerstone Baptist Church is on the corner of Lower Brook Street and Roft Street in a modern 1970s building. Other Nonconformist churches include the Albert Road Evangelical Church, Hope Church (formerly  Church), founded in 1964, and the Cabin Lane Church, established by members of the Hope Church in 1991 following the eastern expansion of Oswestry.

Christ Church, formerly Congregationalist but now shared by the United Reformed Church and the Presbyterian Church of Wales, was the home church of the composer Walford Davies, who sang in the choir. There is a Welsh-speaking church, the  Church, and the Holy Anglican Church, a Western Rite Anglican establishment. Coney Green has a Jehovah's Witness Kingdom Hall. The Religious Society of Friends also holds meetings in Oswestry. The Grade II* star Hermon Chapel, by chapel architect Thomas Thomas, was a Welsh-speaking Congregational church and is now an arts and community centre.

A small Muslim community exists in the town. A plan to transform a 19th-century former Presbyterian church on Oswald Road into a permanent base for meetings and prayer services fell through in March 2013 due to cost. New plans were submitted to Shropshire Council for approval in 2019, to convert the former Salvation Army citadel in King Street into an Islamic Prayer Centre. These plans were eventually approved by Shropshire Council.

There is a small Orthodox Christian community in Oswestry, which has increased in size over years due to the town's growing Bulgarian community. There is no Orthodox church in Oswestry, however, so congregants have to travel to the Greek Orthodox Community of the Holy Fathers of Nicaea, Shrewsbury, to worship. There used to be an Orthodox outreach at Holy Trinity Church for a few years, but a disagreement over the church layout brought this service to an end. Congregants also used to benefit from a Greek Orthodox priest at Weston Rhyn, who left the area in the 1990s.

Healthcare 
The Robert Jones and Agnes Hunt Orthopaedic Hospital NHS Trust in Oswestry provides elective orthopaedic surgery and musculoskeletal medical services. The hospital is located towards Gobowen.

There is a Health Centre on Thomas Savin Road, next to Shelf Bank and opposite the bus station. Within the Health Centre is the Oswestry Minor Injuries Unit, Cambrian Medical Centre and a range of services run by Shropshire Community Health NHS Trust. There are three other GP surgeries situated within the town, and numerous opticians, pharmacists and dentists.

Education 
Oswestry is home to the second oldest 'free' (which in this context means not linked to any ecclesiastical foundation) school in the country, Oswestry School, which was founded in 1407. (The oldest, Winchester College, was founded in 1382.) Oswestry School's 15th century site, adjacent to St Oswald's Parish Church, is now a café restaurant. It used to house the Tourist Information Centre, now moved to Castle view.

There are four state primary schools in Oswestry: The Meadows Primary School, Cabin Lane; Woodside Primary School, Gittin Street; Holy Trinity C.E. Primary Academy & Nursery, Beech Grove and Middleton Road; and Our Lady & St. Oswald's Catholic Primary School, Upper Brook Street. There is also an independent co-educational preparatory school in Church Street, Bellan House, which is run by Oswestry School.

Secondary education is provided by both Oswestry School and the state secondary school with academy status: The Marches School, Morda Road.

Further education is provided by The Marches School's Sixth Form and the North Shropshire College which is situated in the town at Shrewsbury Road and at the Walford Campus near Baschurch.

Transport 

Oswestry is at the junction of the A5 with the A483 and A495. The A5 continues from Shrewsbury to the north, passing the town, before turning west near Chirk and entering Wales.

Bus services are operated by Arriva Midlands and local independents Tanat Valley Coaches, Lakeside Coaches and Owen's Travelmaster. The town has regular bus routes that link nearby villages and towns including Wrexham and Shrewsbury.

Gobowen railway station is 2 miles from the northern edge of Oswestry. It has direct services to Birmingham, Cardiff, Chester and North Wales.
The original station name board 'Gobowen for Oswestry' is permanently displayed on the station platform.

Canals 
A navigable section of the partially restored Montgomery Canal, runs from Frankton Junction (connecting to the Llangollen Branch of the Shropshire Union Canal) to Newtown.

Historic railways 

The railway station, once on the main line of the Cambrian Railways, was closed in 1966 as a consequence of the Beeching cuts. This former Great Western Railway (GWR) branch had once run into a separate GWR Oswestry terminus, but this has long since disappeared and the land redeveloped as a bus station and supermarket. Trains were re-routed into the main Cambrian station from 7 July 1924.

The main building of the Cambrian station is still a prominent landmark in the town centre: it once housed the headquarters of the Cambrian Railways company. After restoration, this building was reopened as the Cambrian Visitor Centre in June 2006 but closed on 11 January 2008.  It later reopened, and has since evolved into the headquarters of the Cambrian Heritage Railways (CHR) and a small catering establishment known as "Buffers"; other parts of the building have been converted into retail and office units to contribute to the upkeep of the building.

A single railway track still runs through the station, once overgrown and rusting, it has been cleared and repaired and is the subject of an ambitious plan to reopen the line as a steam heritage railway between Oswestry and Llanyblodwel and Pant (to link with the restored Montgomery Canal – see above), and as a sustainable community transport rail link from Oswestry to the National Rail railway station at Gobowen.

By 2013, the main "up" platform at Oswestry station had been reconstructed and some new semaphore signalling installed. The branch-line track-bed from south of Gobowen to Llanyblodwel is now owned by Shropshire Council, who lease the land to CHR, a registered charity. Work is advancing in securing the transfer of the existing Transport & Works Act Order (TWAO) from Network Rail to CHR. The aim was for this transfer to be completed by 2014, and for the railway line between Gobowen and Oswestry to be fully re-instated and operational by 2017; however the legal process of the TWAO Unit administering a form of written debate between the proposer and objectors with a guided number of exchanges, was still ongoing in mid 2016. CHR purchase of the final section of the Oswestry to Gobowen railway branch line was completed in April 2016; nevertheless, other hurdles to becoming operational, such as permissions and finances to reinstate the level crossings on the main A5/A483 Trunk Roads, will also need to be overcome.

Immediately to the south of Oswestry Railway Station is the Cambrian Railways Museum; while a short distance to the north are the "listed" Works Bridge and the former Cambrian Railways works, which are now occupied by a variety of local commerce concerns and Oswestry's Community Health Centre and ambulance facility.

Sport 

Since 2013, the town has been represented in football by F.C. Oswestry Town, who are currently members of the North West Counties Football League Division One South. The former local football club, Oswestry Town F.C., was one of the few English teams to compete in the League of Wales. It also won the Welsh Cup in 1884, 1901 and 1907. The club folded due to financial difficulties in 2003 and merged with Total Network Solutions F.C. of Llansantffraid, a village eight miles (13 km) away on the Welsh side of the border. Following the takeover of the club's sponsor in 2006, the club was renamed as The New Saints. They moved to the redeveloped Park Hall Stadium on the outskirts of the town in September 2007. The New Saints or TNS is a full-time-professional football club that play in the Welsh Premier League, which they have won a record twelve times.

Oswestry Lions F.C. of the Shropshire County League also play at the ground.

Recreation and leisure 
From the 1700s to 1848, there was a popular racecourse outside the town. Remnants of the old grandstand and figure-of-eight racetrack can still be seen.

Nowadays, Oswestry Race Course is common land, registered under the Commons Act 1899 and the Countryside and Rights of Way Act 2000, with a number of rights of way on the South Common including Offa's Dyke Path and Bridleway. Also designated as a publicly accessible open space and a Wildlife Site in the 1999 Local Plan, it is an area reserved for:

quiet, informal leisure activities and recreation;
the biological diversity of the matrix of heathland, sparse woodland, ponds and ditches;  and
the sustainable management and conservation of nature and wildlife.

The site provides extensive views across the surrounding landscape of England and Wales.

The  to Chirk Mill section of the Offa's Dyke Path National Trail crosses the common.

Twin towns
Oswestry is twinned with:

Notable people

Arts and media
Guto'r Glyn (c1412-c1493) Welsh bard, resident of the town as appears from poem, In Praise of Oswestry.
 Shirley Brooks (1816–1874) journalist, novelist  and editor of Punch, lived there when training as a solicitor 1832–38
 William Archibald Spooner (1844–1930) Oxford don, originator of the Spoonerism, educated at Oswestry School
 Sir Henry Walford Davies  KCVO OBE (1869 in Oswestry – 1941) composer, Master of the Queen's Music  1934 / 1941
 Wilfred Owen MC (1893 in Oswestry – 1918) poet and soldier in the first World War
 Ivor Roberts-Jones RA (1913 in Oswestry – 1996) sculptor, sculpted Sir Winston Churchill in Parliament Square
 Barbara Pym (1913 in Oswestry – 1980) novelist, Booker Prize nominee 1977
 Michael Croft OBE (1922 in Hengoed – 1986) actor, schoolteacher and writer.
 Frank Bough  (1933-2020) former television presenter, went to school in Oswestry
 Ian Hunter  (born 1939 in Oswestry) lead singer of the English rock band Mott the Hoople 1969 / 1974
 Philip Llewellin  (1940 in Oswestry – 2005) journalist and writer, went to Oswestry School
 Paul Jerricho (born 1948 in Oswestry) actor, educated at Oswestry School
 Peter Edwards (born 1955) BP Portrait Award-winning artist, went to Oswestry school
 Jesse Armstrong (born in Oswestry 1970) comedy writer, best known for the Channel 4 sitcom Peep Show and the BBC political satire The Thick of It.

Public service 
 Roger Palmer, 1st Earl of Castlemaine (1634–1705) courtier and diplomat
 Owen Owen (1850–1920) teacher, headmaster and school inspector in Wales
 Harold Whitfield (1886–1956) Victoria Cross recipient
 Francis Humphrys (1879–1971) cricketer, colonial administrator and diplomat
 John Lloyd Williams MC (1894-unknown), World War I flying ace, Chief Constable of Cardiganshire
 Trevor Rees-Jones (1968-) bodyguard of Diana, Princess of Wales

Religion and politics
 William FitzAlan, Lord of Oswestry (1105–1160) nobleman of Breton ancestry, major landowner and a Marcher lord
 John FitzAlan, Lord of Oswestry, Clun and Arundel (1223–1267) Marcher Lord with lands in the Welsh Marches.
 David Holbache (c.1355 – c.1422) Welsh politician, MP for Shropshire, founded Oswestry School in 1407.
 Robert Ussher, (1592–1642) Provost of Trinity College, Dublin and Bishop of Kildare, buried at Doddleston Chapel, near Oswestry
 Thomas Bray (c.1657–1730) clergyman and abolitionist, went to Oswestry School
 Stanley Leighton (1837 – 1901) barrister, landowner, artist, antiquarian and Conservative MP for Oswestry 1885 / 1901
 Francis Jayne (1845-1921), former Bishop of Chester, died in retirement at Oswestry.
 George Ormsby-Gore, 3rd Baron Harlech (1855–1938), British soldier and Conservative MP for Oswestry 1901 / 1904
 William Griffith Thomas (1861 in Oswestry – 1924), Anglican cleric and scholar
 William Bridgeman, 1st Viscount Bridgeman (1864–1935) Home Secretary 1922 / 1924 and Conservative MP for Oswestry 1906 / 1929
 Kate Williams Evans (1866-1961), suffragette, died in Oswestry
 Bertie Leighton (1875–1952), Army officer, landowner and Conservative MP for Oswestry 1929 / 1945
 David Ormsby-Gore, 5th Baron Harlech (1918–1985), diplomat and Conservative MP for Oswestry 1950 / 1961
 John Biffen (1930–2007) respectfully regarded Conservative MP for Oswestry 1961 / 1997
 George Foulkes, Baron Foulkes of Cumnock (born 1942 in Oswestry), former Scottish Labour Co-operative MP, now life peer

Science, medicine and business
 Thomas Mainwaring Penson (1818 in Oswestry – 1864), surveyor and architect, educated at Oswestry School
 Thomas Savin (1826 in Llwynymaen – 1889 in Oswestry), railway engineer, buried Oswestry Cemetery
 Edward Weston (1850 in Oswestry – 1936) chemist, developed electroplating and the Weston cell in the USA
 Northcote W. Thomas (1868 in Oswestry - 1936) British anthropologist and psychical researcher
 Katharine Lloyd-Williams CBE (1896 in Oswestry – 1973) anaesthetist, general practitioner and medical educator
 Gordon Jackson Rees (1918 in Oswestry – 2001) anesthesiologist and a pioneer in pediatric anesthesia
 Dame Steve Shirley CH DBE FREng FBCS (born 1933) information technology pioneer, businesswoman and philanthropist, Kindertransport child refugee, lived at Oswestry for six years and attended Oswestry Girls' High School.
Sir Malcolm Walker CBE (born 1946 in Yorkshire) Founded the supermarket chain Iceland in the town in 1970
 Per Lindstrand (born 1948) Swedish aeronautical engineer and pilot, founded Lindstrand Balloons in Oswestry
 Ian Robertson CMG (born 1958 in Oswestry) automotive executive, MD of Land Rover, now on the Board of BMW Group

Sports
 Alfred Payne (1849 in Oswestry – 1927) cricketer for the Marylebone Cricket Club
 Di Jones (1867 in Trefonen – 1902) Welsh international footballer, 340 club caps for Bolton Wanderers F.C. and Manchester City F.C.
 Charlie Morris (1880 in Oswestry – 1952) footballer, 277 club caps for Derby County F.C.
 George Wynn (1886 in Treflach – 1966) Welsh professional footballer
 Herbie Roberts (1905 in Oswestry – 1944) footballer, 297 club caps for Arsenal F.C.
 Harry Cooke (1919 in Oswestry - 1992) footballer, 228 club caps for Luton Town
 Harry Weetman (1920 in Oswestry - 1972) golfer
 Alan Ball, Sr (1924-1982) football player and club manager, kept The King's Head public house in Church Street while being player-manager at Oswestry Town. His son Alan Ball, Jr (1945-2007) later England player in the 1966 World Cup and club manager, attended Oswestry Boys' High School and also played with Oswestry Town during the same period.
 Fred Morris (1929 in Oswestry – 1998) footballer, 350 club caps, mainly for Walsall F.C.
 Andy Lloyd (1956 in Oswestry) England test cricketer and captain of Warwickshire CCC
 Ian Woosnam OBE (born 1958 in Oswestry) Welsh professional golfer
 Carl Griffiths (born 1971 in Oswestry) retired footballer, 334 club caps beginning at Shrewsbury Town F.C.
 Darren Ryan (born 1972 in Oswestry) former footballer, over 300 club caps; now trains youngsters at Wolves
 Paul Evans (born 1974 in Oswestry) retired footballer, 475 club caps beginning at Shrewsbury Town F.C.
 Boaz Myhill (born 1982) football goalkeeper, over 350 club caps, mostly for Hull City F.C.
 Amy Hughes (born 1987) marathon runner, a sports therapist in Oswestry
 Matt Done (born 1988 in Oswestry) professional footballer, over 350 club caps, plays for Rochdale

See also
 Listed buildings in Oswestry
 Battle of Oswestry - Civil War

References

External links 

 
 Oswestry Town Council

 
Holy wells in England
Market towns in Shropshire
Towns of the Welsh Marches
Towns in Shropshire
Railway towns in England
Civil parishes in Shropshire